The group stage of the 2017 Sudirman Cup was the first stage of the competition. It began on 21 May and ended on 25 May, held at Carrara Sport and Leisure Centre in Gold Coast, Australia. The top two teams from each group (8 in total) advanced to the final knockout stage to compete in a single-elimination tournament. The teams from group 2 and 3 (14 in total) advanced to the final classification stage to compete in a single-elimination tournament.

Seedings
The seedings for 32 teams competing in the tournament were released on March 2, 2017. It was based on aggregated points from the best players in the world ranking. The tournament was divided into four groups, with twelve teams in the elite group competing for the title. Eight teams were seeded into second and third groups and four remaining teams were seeded into fourth group. 

On the day of the draw, it was announced that the original list of 32 teams was pared down to 28, with four teams – Mexico, Netherlands, Spain and Sweden were withdrawing from the tournament. The 28 participating teams were divided into four groups, with Group 1 consisting of the 12 teams that will compete for the title. Group 2 and Group 3 (eight teams each) will fight for overall placings. The draw was held on March 17, 2017. England withdrew from the Sudirman Cup on April 4, 2017.

Group composition

Group 1A

China vs Hong Kong

Thailand vs Hong Kong

China vs Thailand

Group 1B

Korea vs Russia

Chinese Taipei vs Russia

Korea vs Chinese Taipei

Group 1C

Japan vs Germany

Malaysia vs Germany

Japan vs Malaysia

Group 1D

Denmark vs India

Indonesia vs India

Denmark vs Indonesia

Group 2A

Vietnam vs New Zealand

Scotland vs Canada

Vietnam vs Canada

Scotland vs New Zealand

Canada vs New Zealand

Vietnam vs Scotland

Group 2B

Australia vs United States

Singapore vs Austria

Australia vs Austria

Singapore vs United States

United States vs Austria

Singapore vs Australia

Group 3A

New Caledonia vs Guam

Macau vs Guam

New Caledonia vs Macau

Group 3B

Sri Lanka vs Fiji

Slovakia vs Tahiti

Sri Lanka vs Tahiti

Slovakia vs Fiji

Tahiti vs Fiji

Sri Lanka vs Slovakia

References

External links
 

Sudirman Cup
Sudirman Cup group stage